Acme is Ancient Greek (ἀκμή; English transliteration: akmē) for "the peak", "zenith" or "prime". It may refer to:

Arts and entertainment
 Acme (album), an album by the Jon Spencer Blues Explosion
 Acme and Septimius, a fictional couple in Catullus 45, a poem by Roman poet Catullus
 Acme Corporation, a fictional company originating in Looney Tunes cartoons, later a generic fictional company name
 ACME Detective Agency, a fictional detective agency in the Carmen Sandiego computer games and television shows
 Acme Studios, a London charity that provides studio and living space for visual artists

Businesses

Bangladesh
 The ACME Laboratories Ltd, a pharmaceutical company

United Kingdom
 Acme Motor Co, a defunct motorcycle manufacturer based in Coventry
 Acme Press Ltd., a defunct comics publisher (and retailer) in England
 Acme Space, an architecture firm based in London
 Acme Whistles, a major producer of whistles
 Acme Software, a former name of Rockstar North, a video game development company

United States
 Acme Aircraft Co, later known as Sierradyne, an aircraft manufacturer based in Torrance, California
 Acme Aircraft Corporation, an aircraft manufacturer based in Rockford, Illinois, during the 1920s
 Acme Boots, a manufacturer of western footwear owned by Berkshire Hathaway
 Acme Bread Company, a bakery in Berkeley, California
 Acme Brick, a brick manufacturer that is a subsidiary of Berkshire Hathaway
 ACME Comics & Collectibles, a comics and collectibles store in Sioux City, Iowa
 ACME Communications, a television broadcasting company, based in Santa Ana, California
 Acme Fresh Market, a chain of grocery stores in northeast Ohio
 Acme Markets, a chain of grocery stores in the northeast
 Acme (automobile) (Acme Motor Car Company), an early motor car manufacturer
 ACME Newspictures
 Acme Packet, a VoIP Session Border Controller manufacturer
 Acme Tackle Company, a producer of fishing tackle in Providence, Rhode Island
 Acme Truck Line, a national transportation service based in Gretna, Louisiana
 Acme United Corporation, a scissors manufacturer founded in 1867 in Naugatuck, Connecticut
 Air Craft Marine Engineering, a short-lived aircraft manufacturer established in 1954

Places

Canada
 Acme, Alberta, a village

United States
 Acme, Indiana, an unincorporated town
 Acme, Kansas, an unincorporated community
 Acme, Louisiana, an unincorporated community
 Acme, Michigan, an unincorporated community
 Acme Township, Michigan
 Acme, North Carolina, an unincorporated community
 Acme Township, Hettinger County, North Dakota
 Acme, Oklahoma, a ghost town
 Acme, Pennsylvania, an unincorporated community
 Acme, Texas, a ghost town
 Acme, Washington, a census-designated place
 Acme, West Virginia, an unincorporated community

Buildings
 Acme Farm Supply Building, a listed building in Nashville, Tennessee
 ACME Comedy Theatre, a sketch comedy and improvisational theater located near Hollywood

Science, technology and mathematics
 Acme (computer virus), a computer virus which infects DOS .EXE executable files
 ACME (health software) automated determination of cause of death, used by several governments for the generation of national mortality statistics
 Acme (text editor), a text editor and development environment originally for the Plan 9 from Bell Labs operating system
 Acme thread form, a screw thread used in specialized applications such as vises and leadscrews
 Acme zone, a biostratigraphic zone where a fossil reaches its peak abundance
 Arginine catabolic mobile element, a genetic system used by bacteria to tolerate skin polyamine defense compounds
 Automatic Certificate Management Environment, a protocol for communications between a certificate authority and its users' web servers
 Summit or acme, a topographic term
 Advisory Committee on Mathematics Education, a British organisation established in 2002 by the Royal Society and the Joint Mathematical Council
 ACME Laboratories, an open source software host of Jef Poskanzer

Ships
 Accentor-class minesweeper, a US Navy class sometimes called the Accentor/Acme class
 USS Acme (AMc-61), a coastal minesweeper launched in 1941
 USS Acme (MSO-508), a minesweeper launched in 1955
 USS Abarenda (IX-131) SS Acme, original name of the, a storage tanker
 Acme (1876), a schooner built in Sydney, Australia
 Acme (steamboat), operated in the state of Washington from 1899 to 1910

Vehicles

 Acme motorcycle (1911–1913), an Australian motorcycle
 Acme motorcycle (1915–1917), a motorcycle assembled in Burnie, Tasmania
 Acme motorcycle (1939–1949), an Australian motorcycle

Other uses
 Acme (enslaved woman) (died 5 BC), Jewish slave and personal maid to Empress Livia Drusilla
 Acme (solitaire), a card game